Bunyoro or Bunyoro-Kitara is a Bantu kingdom in Western Uganda. It was one of the most powerful kingdoms in Central and East Africa from the 13th century to the 19th century. It is ruled by the King (Omukama) of Bunyoro-Kitara.  The current ruler is Solomon Iguru I, the 27th Omukama.

The people of Bunyoro are also known as Nyoro or Banyoro (singular: Munyoro); Banyoro means "people of Bunyoro"). The language spoken is Nyoro, also known as Runyoro. In the past, the traditional economy revolved around big game hunting of elephants, lions, leopards, and crocodiles. Today, the Banyoro are now agriculturalists who cultivate bananas, millet, cassava, yams, cotton, tobacco, coffee, and rice. The people are primarily Christian.

Establishment 
The kingdom of Bunyoro was established in the early 14th century by Rukidi-Mpuga after the dissolution of the Chwezi Empire. The founders of Bunyoro-Kitara were known as the Babiito, a people who succeeded the Bachwezi.

History

Bunyoro-Kitara Kingdom (Uganda)

The kingdom was formed after the dissolution of the Chwezi Empire. Later, new kingdoms arose in the Great Lakes area, such as Ankole, Mpororo, Buganda, Toro, Busoga, Bagisu (in present-day Kenya and Uganda), Rwanda, Burundi and Bunyoro itself. The kingdom rose to power and controlled a number of the holiest shrines in the region, as well as the lucrative Kibiro saltworks of Lake Mwitanzige. Having the highest quality of metallurgy in the region made it one of the strongest economic and military powers in the Great Lakes region.

The kingship of Bunyoro is the most important institution in the kingdom. The king is patrilineal meaning that it is passed down through the male line. This tradition comes from a myth the Nyoro people tell. Once there were three sons of the Mukama, all having the same name. In order to name them, the Mukama asked the God to help him. The boys must go through a series of tasks before being named. The three of them had to sit all night holding a pot of milk. Milk is a sacred drink used for important events. Whoever had all their milk still in the pot by morning would be king. The youngest son dropped the milk and begged his older brothers to give him some of theirs, they did. When morning came the eldest son dropped a little more. When God and the Mukama came to observe the pots, the eldest son was named after the peasants who are not fit for cattle herding since he had no milk left. The middle son was named after cattle herders and the youngest son was named Oukama and later Mukama or king for having the most. This myth shows the ways in which the Nyoro infuses religion and kingship together.

Decline 
Bunyoro began to decline in the late eighteenth century due to internal divisions.  Buganda seized the Kooki and Buddu regions from Bunyoro at the end of the century.  In the 1830s, the large province of Toro separated, claiming much of the lucrative salt works. To the south Rwanda and Ankole were both growing rapidly, taking over some of the smaller kingdoms that had been Bunyoro's vassals.

Thus by the mid-nineteenth century Bunyoro (also known as Unyoro at the time) was a far smaller state, though it was still wealthy due to the income generated from controlling the lucrative trade routes over Lake Victoria and linking to the coast of the Indian Ocean. In particular, Bunyoro benefited from the trade in ivory. Due to the volatile nature of the ivory trade, an armed struggle developed between the Baganda and the Banyoro. As a result, the capital was moved from Masindi to the less vulnerable Mparo. Following the death of Omakuma Kyebambe III, the region experienced a period of political instability where two kings ruled in a volatile political environment.

In July 1890 an agreement was settled whereby the entire region north of Lake Victoria was given to Great Britain.  In 1894 Great Britain declared the region its protectorate. In alliance with Buganda, King Omukama Kabalega of Bunyoro resisted the efforts of Great Britain, aiming to take control of the kingdom.  However, in 1899 Omukama Kabalega was captured and exiled to the Seychelles, and Bunyoro was subsequently annexed to the British Empire.  Because of Bunyoro's resistance to the British, a portion of the Bunyoro kingdom's territory was given to Buganda and Toro.

The country was put under the governance of Buganda administrators.  The Banyoro revolted in 1907; the revolt was put down, and relations improved somewhat.  After the region remained loyal to Great Britain in World War I a new agreement was made in 1933 giving the region more autonomy. Bunyoro remains as one of the five constituent kingdoms of Uganda, along with Buganda, Busoga, Rwenzururu, and Tooro.

Contemporary society 
During the first regime of Milton Obote, the Kingdom of Bunyoro initially benefited from regaining the two "lost counties" of Buyaga and Bugangaizi following a 1964 referendum. It was, however, forcefully disbanded in 1967. The kingdom, together with three others, Buganda, Busoga, Toro, remained banned during the regime of dictator Idi Amin (1971–1979) and the second regime of Milton Obote (1980–1985) and remained banned until 1993.

In 1993 the Kingdom was re-established and in 1995 the new constitution of Uganda was made, allowing and recognizing the Kingdoms. The current Kingdom covers the districts of Buliisa District, Hoima district, Kibaale District, Kakumiro District, Kagadi District, Kiryandongo District and Masindi District.

According to 1997 projections, the total population of the Kingdom is between 800,000 but there may be 1,400,000 (depending on sources) living in 250,000-350,000 households. 96% of the population lives in rural areas, and only 1% of the population uses electricity for lighting and cooking. More than 92% of the population is poor, and earned less than half that of the Ugandan national average, and about 50% of the population is illiterate.

Culture

Ebikoikyo – Riddles 
Here are some of the common riddles in Bunyoro-Kitara. The narrator says Koikoi and the  listener responds Rukwebe. Then the narrator says the *first part* of the riddle in the Koikoi column below and the listener gives the answer in the Rukwebe column.

Abakama (Kings) of Bunyoro-Kitara 

 The earlier dates as estimated using:

Babiito. Biharwe full moon eclipse that happened in 1520 AD when Omukama Olimi ImRwitamahanga was on expedition from Rwanda and Ankole.

 Meaning of some of the Titles/Names of the Kings.

Rukidi or kidi - means a stone
Ocaki - Let's Start
Oyo - Rat
Winyi - Listen
Olimi - Visit you
Kyebambe - usurper
Chwa - cutter

Kingship in Bunyoro 

Kintu, his wife Kati, settled with their cattle and a white cow named (kitara). Kintu and Kati had three sons. The first son was called Kairu, the second son was called Kahuma and the third and youngest was called Kakama.

When Kintu had reached old age, he began to worry about the successor to the throne. He decided to set his sons a test to discover the ablest of them. He tried them in many ways. But one day he called them together and spoke thus:

Children, death is near; but I would like you to do something for me and the one who does it best will be my successor. He will sit on my royal throne and will rule over his brothers." 
In the first test, the boys had to select some items that were placed along a path where they would find them.

For the first test, Potatoes, millet, leather thong/strap and a ox’s head were placed along the path, As the children walked, they found the things in the path, the eldest son picked up the potatoes and millet, the second pick up the leather thong and the youngest, picked the ox’s head.

In the second test, the boys had to keep bowls of milk on their lap during a night until morning.

In the evening Kintu milked the cows and filled three bowls with milk. He summoned his sons and handed them the bowls with milk, saying: "If by morning all your bowls of milk are still fuII, I will divide my kingdom between the three of you. But If only one of you passes this test, he will be my successor and he will rule over you."  Having said this, he retired to sleep.

The sons remained in the sitting room, each with his bowl of milk on his lap. After a short time, Kakama, the youngest son, was overcome by sleep and spilled some of his milk. He wept. He begged his brothers to give him some of their milk with which to refill his bowl. His brothers took pity on him and granted his request. They did so because he was their youngest brother and they loved him dearly.  Now all the three brothers had the same amount of milk in their bowls.
 
At cockcrow, Kairu, the eldest son, was also overcome by sleep and spilled nearly all his milk. Kairu nevertheless retained his courage and, instead of grieving over his misfortune, shared the little milk he was left with between his brothers. After some time, Kahuma, the second son, fell asleep and spilled a lot of his milk. In the morning their father came into the seating room and greeted them. Kairu was the first to report his failure. His father was not angry with him but teased him about his physical strength. Kahuma tried to explain to him his unsuccessful effort to save his own milk.

Again his father was not angry with him but teased him about his bodily weakness. Then Kakama said to his father triumphantly: "Here is my milk, father." His father was surprised and said: "The ruler is always born last." But his elder brothers protested, saying that Kakama had been the first to spill his own milk and that they had been kind enough to give him some of theirs to fill his bowl. But their father only replied: "Since you have consented to give him some of your milk, you should also consent to be ruled by him." On hearing this, the two brothers decided to recognize their young brother as their future king, partly because they were jealous of each other.

The oldest son was named Kairu, which means “little peasant” for he had shown that he knew nothing about the value of cattle or milk. He had spilled all his milk, and he had chosen potatoes and millet from the items along the path. He and all his descendants forever would be farmers and servants.

The second he named Kahuma which means (little herdsman), This is because he had chosen the leather thong/stap, used for tying up cattle, and only half of his milk was missing

The youngest son had all his milk. And he had chosen the head of an ox in the first test. Ruhanga named him Kakama, which means “little mukama.” A mukama is a ruler.

Then Kintu admonished his sons thus: "You, my child Kairu, never desert your young brother. Serve him well." To Kahuma: "And you, my child, never desert your young brother also. Help him to look after the cattle and obey him." And to Kakama [the successor]: "You have now become the eldest of your brothers. Love them and treat them well. Give them whatever they ask of you. Now that you are king, rule the kingdom well." Sometime after this incident Kintu vanished. People searched for him everywhere but in vain. It was therefore presumed that he must have disappeared into the underworld.

Omukama Nyamuhanga also ruled over many people, because during his reign there was further increase in population. He was greatly loved by his people. A long time elapsed before he could have a child. This happened after he had consulted a witch doctor, who advised him to marry a certain girl called Nyabagabe, the daughter of one of his servants called Igoro. Nyabagabe bore him a son, whom he named Nkya [meaning "Lucky"]. People were delighted at Nyabagabe's good luck. They were glad that the daughter of a mere servant had married a king. Even today when something lucky happened to someone, people would comment: "That one must have been born at about the time Nyabagabe was in labor." King Nyamuhanga is still remembered today by many people.

Nkya I ruled over many people and was also loved by them. Like his father, he was barren for a long time. Like his father, too, he had to consult a witch doctor, as a result of which he begot a son, whom he declined to name. When questioned about his decision he replied that he saw no reason to give his son a different name from his, because both of them were born under similar circumstances. When Nkya, Junior, therefore succeeded his father he assumed the title of Nkya II. Nkya II was succeeded by Baba, and Nseka by Kudidi. Kudidi reigned for a very long time and died a very old man. He was succeeded by Ntonzi, who came to be known as "Ntonzi who ruled by the sword" because he put down rebellions in the country. Ntonzi was succeeded by Nyakahongerwa and Nyakahongerwa by Mukonko, his son. Mukonko's reign lasted for a very long time and those who Iived under him were also to experience Bachwezi rule. Rutahinduka ["the one who never turns to look behind"], son of Mukonko, came to the throne already an old man [on account of his father's long span of life]. He was nicknamed "Ngonzaki Rutahinduka" because he used to say to people who teased him about his father's long life: "Ngonzaki [What do I need!]." He was a very rich man and did not feel that becoming king was particularly important to him. This was how he came to be called "Ngonzaki Rutahinduka."

He had a son called Isaza Waraga Rugambanabato, who ascended the throne while still very young. Consequently, the young monarch continued to play around with his fellow young friends and hated old men. He did his best to harass them and even went as far as putting some of them to death. The frightened old men feared him and avoided him. The young monarch was therefore nicknamed "Rugambanabato [he who talks only with young people]." This nickname was to become his official title.

Relations 

The Banyoro were traditionally a polygamous people when they could afford it. Many marriages did not last and it was quite common to be divorced. Due to this, payment to the girl's family was not normally given until after several years of marriage. Premarital sex was also very common.

All families were ruled by the eldest man of the family (called Nyineka), and the village was run by a specially elected elder who was chosen by all the elders in the village.  He was known as a mukuru w’omugongo.

Birth 
A few months after birth, the baby would be given a name. This was normally done by a close relative, but the father always had the final say. Two names are given: a personal name, and a traditional Empaako name. The names were often related to specific features on the child, special circumstances in the birth of the child or as a way to honor a former family member. Most of the names are actual words of the Nyoro language and some are etymologically Luo language words. The Empaako or Mpako names include Okaali (for Kings only); Apuuli, Acaali, Araali and Bbala (for males only) and Adyeeri, Abooki, Abwooli, Amooti, Ateenyi, Atwooki and Akiiki, which can be used for both males and females. (Stephen Rwagweri Atwoki, E. D. -Engabu za Tooro). (Mi pako or M'pako in  Luo language, would mean of honour/in honour of, therefore, Empaako or Mpaako/Mpako is a title of Honour, even in Luo.

Death 
Death was almost always believed to be the work of evil magic, ghosts, or similar. Gossiping was believed to magically affect or harm people. Death was viewed as being a real being.  When a person died, the oldest woman of the household would clean the body, cut the hair and beard, and close the eyes of the departed. The body was left for viewing and the women and children were allowed to cry/weep, but the men were not. In case the dead was the head of the household, a mixture of grain (called ensigosigo) was put in his hand, and his children had to take a small part of the grain and eat it - thus passing on his (magical) powers.

After one or two days, the body would be wrapped in cloth and a series of rites would be carried out. The following rites are only for heads of family: 
 The nephew must take down the central pole of the hut and throw it in the middle of the compound
 The nephew would also take the bow and eating-bowl of the departed and throw it with the pole
 The fireplace in the hut would be extinguished
 A banana plant from the family plantation and a pot of water was also added to the pile
 The family rooster had to be caught and killed
 The main bull of the family's cattle had to be prevented from mating during the mourning by castration
 After four days of mourning, the bull would be killed and eaten, thus ending the period of mourning
 The house of the departed would not be used again

The burial would not be done in the middle of the day, as it was considered dangerous for the sun to shine directly into the grave. As the body was carried to the grave the women were required to moderate their weeping, and it was forbidden to weep at the grave. Also pregnant women were banned from participating in the funeral as it was believed the negative magical forces related to burial would be too strong for the unborn child to survive. After the burial the family would cut some of their hair off and put it onto the grave. After the burial, all participants washed themselves thoroughly, as it was believed that the negative magical forces could harm crops.

If the departed had a grudge or other unfinished business with another family, his mouth and anus would be stuffed with clay, to prevent the ghost from haunting.

A Bunyoro Year 
Periodicity/Calendar (Obusumi) in Bunyoro-Kitara

A study of the periodicity of Kitara's markets must concept of the obusumi (calendar or time). It resembles European calendar, but is tied up with the motions of the moon and other heavenly bodies. For example, from the appearance of a new moon to the appearance of the next one constituted a month. This month is roughly thirty days.

This twelve-month obusumi year is divided into Isambya and the Irumbi. The Isambya lasts from Igesa(January) to Rwenkonzi (June). These may be described as summer months.

Irumbi lasts from Isenyamaro (July) to Nyamiganuro-Kyanda (December) and is equivalent to the autumn.

The Irumbi is further divided into two equal parts: kyanda (dry season) December to January, and Itumba (rainy season between September and November, during which rainfall is sufficient to enable weeds, crops, and grass to grow).

The Isambya is also divided into two equal parts: the Kasambura, is a dry season between June and August which is the harvesting period; and the Itoigo, rainy season which is between March to May, which is also a planting period.

Each of the twelve month of the year has its own name, determined by the cycle of production. Example,

 Igesa means the period for harvesting millet and beans,
 Ijubyamiyonga-Bwanswa(March) signifies the month when rains begin after harvesting.
 Machanda (April), is the month when simsim is sown/planted;
 Isiga(September), when crops (e.g. millet) are sown/planted; the word Isiga means sowing.
 ijuba or Kacungiramweru(October) is the weeding month,
 Rwensenene is the month when grasshoppers are harvested.
 Nyamiganura if a period of harvesting
 Rwenkonzi – comes from enkonzikonzi, a type of grass used for brooms, Rwenkonzi is a place full of these grass plants
 Nyamujuna – literally means savior, this month is when crops start to yield before harvesting begins hence meaning we have been saved
 Kayaga – the windy month
 Kukokooba – is to prepare the garden by removing grass, usually by burning it

See also
Isingoma Labongo Rukidi

References

External links

The National University of Bunyoro-Kitara Kingdom
Bunyoro-Kitara Kingdom
Bunyoro-Kitara Kingdom NGO.
Royal Coat of Arms of Bunyoro-Kitara
More on the Bunyoro Culture

 
Sub-regions of Uganda
Ugandan monarchies
Ethnic groups in Uganda
Non-sovereign monarchy